Indonesia participated in the 1966 Asian Games held in Bangkok, Thailand from December 9, 1966 to December 20, 1966.
It was ranked seventh in medal count, with five gold medals, five silver medals, and twelve bronze medals, for a total of twenty-two.

Medal summary

Medal table

Medalists

References

Nations at the 1966 Asian Games
1966